Dandini is a character in the opera La Cenerentola by Rossini and also in the Cinderella pantomime.  He is the male servant of the Prince (the principal male character: Don Ramiro in the opera, commonly Prince Charming in the pantomime).  Dandini helps the Prince to meet the principal female character (known as  Angelina or Cinderella) without her knowing that he is a prince.  Dandini pretends to be the prince and the real prince pretends to be his servant.

In panto it is often played by a young woman, who dresses similarly to the Principal boy for the identity swap.

Notable people who have played Dandini

Opera
Sesto Bruscantini
Luigi Lablache
Giorgio Ronconi
Antonio Tamburini opera

Pantomime
Julian Clary
Florrie Forde
Stephen Gately
Pat Kirkwood
Gertrude Lawrence (as Alexandra Dagmar)
Alice Lloyd
Mary Malcolm
Wendy Richard
Wayne Sleep
Louie Spence
Nellie Wallace
Dorothy Ward
Sid Sloane

References

Characters in plays
Theatre characters introduced in 1817
Fictional servants
Fictional Italian people
Cross-dressing in theatre
Male characters in theatre
Pantomime